Varsselder is a Dutch village situated in the Gelderland region Achterhoek, in the municipality Oude IJsselstreek.  It is situated directly to the west of Ulft and it is crossed by the road from Ulft to 's-Heerenberg (N816).

The church is called Martelaren van Gorcumkerk. The village has a former windmill. 

Veldhunten is a smaller rural settlement close to Varsselder.

Gallery

References

Oude IJsselstreek
Populated places in Gelderland